This is a list of Hungarian football transfers in the summer transfer window 2018 by club. Only transfers in Nemzeti Bajnokság I, and Nemzeti Bajnokság II are included.

Nemzeti Bajnokság I

Budapest Honvéd

In:

Out:

Debrecen

In:

Out:

Diósgyőr

In:

Out:

Ferencváros

In:

Out:

Kisvárda

In:

Out:

Mezőkövesd

In:

Out:

MTK Budapest

In:

Out:

Paks

In:

Out:

Puskás Akadémia

In:

Out:

Szombathelyi Haladás

In:

Out:

Újpest

In:

Out:

Vidi

In:

Out:

Nemzeti Bajnokság II

Balmazújváros

In:

Out:

Békéscsaba

In:

Out:

See also
 2018–19 Nemzeti Bajnokság I

References

External links
 Official site of the Hungarian Football Association
 Official site of the Nemzeti Bajnokság I

Hungarian
2018
Transfers